Jessica Rosenthal (born 28 October 1992) is a German politician. She is a member of the Social Democratic Party (SPD) who has been a member of the Bundestag since 2021, representing the Bonn district.

Early life 
Rosenthal was born 1992 in Hameln. She studied teaching.

Political career
Rosenthal joined the SPD in 2013. In January 2021 she was elected chairwoman of the Young Socialists in the SPD.

Rosenthal was elected to the Bundestag in 2021. In the negotiations to form a so-called traffic light coalition of the SPD, the Green Party and the Free Democrats (FDP) following elections, she was part of her party's delegation in the working group on education policy, co-chaired by Andreas Stoch, Felix Banaszak and Jens Brandenburg.

In parliament, Rosenthal has since been serving on the Committee on Education, Research and Technology Assessment. Within her own parliamentary group, she is part of a working group on migration and integration.

Other activities
 Federal Agency for Civic Education, Alternate Member of the Board of Trustees (since 2022)
 Haus der Geschichte, Member of the Board of Trustees (since 2022)
 Education and Science Workers' Union (GEW), Member

Political positions
Amid the 2022 Russian invasion of Ukraine, Rosenthal opposed the Scholz government's effort to change Germany’s constitution to allow for a credit-based special defense fund of 100 billion euros ($107.35 billion).

References

Living people
1992 births
Social Democratic Party of Germany politicians
Members of the Bundestag 2021–2025
21st-century German politicians
21st-century German women politicians
Female members of the Bundestag